Ricardo Cisneros, known by his stage name Ricky C, is an American-born Latin pop recording artist. Ricky C is a singer, songwriter, dancer, music composer, music producer, and sound engineer. He records and writes in both English and Spanish.

Early life 
Son of Ecuadorian parents, Ricky C was born in Chicago and raised in Miami, Florida. Ricky’s father, Segundo Cisneros, was a Latin singer who released multiple albums and performed worldwide. His father introduced Ricky to music at a young age. At 17, Ricky C decided to pursue music professionally and he began his career under the tutelage of his father.

Music career 
In 1998 Ricky C signs with Tower Records for a distribution deal for 2 albums.
In 2002 Ricky C tours South America and the UK.
In 2006, Ricky's father/manager dies from cancer.
In 2007 Ricky began working with music producer Humberto "Humby" Viana for Miami-based label Sculvia Entertainment. Together they wrote and produced "Otro Amor" which caught the attention of Universal Music Latin Entertainment/Machete Music.

Notable performances include the Latin Billboard Awards Showcase with ASCAP, the National Anthem for the New Orleans Saints and the Los Angeles Lakers, God Bless America for the Atlanta Braves, the Calle Ocho Carnival Festival, and the WPOW Beach House concert. Ricky C has been featured in Billboard magazine, ASCAP Playback Magazine, and was signed as a spokesperson for the Tobacco Free Florida campaign.

 Ricky C's Spanish-language debut single "Otro Amor" was released on August 24, 2010 on iTunes and Amazon.com. The music video of "Otro Amor" is currently playing on vevo, YouTube, mun2, and Htv. The song peaked at #12 on the Latin Billboards Tropical Charts on June 11, 2011. In December 2009, Ricky was featured in the official remix to Nelly Furtado's second Spanish-album single "Más". Early 2011, Ricky C participated on 2 songs on Jon Secada's Spanish-pop album "Otra Vez". "No Puedo Olvidarte" and "Dimension". Both songs were written and produced by Ricky Cisneros and Humberto "Humby" Viana. For the song "Dimension" that Ricky C is featured on, the pads were done by Miami-based producer Yrakly "Blayd" Lemus.

References 

Living people
1980 births
21st-century American singers
21st-century American male singers